The 1991 IBF World Championships (World Badminton Championships) were held in Copenhagen, Denmark, in 1991.

Host city selection
Copenhagen and Hong Kong submitted bids to host the championships.

Venue
Brøndby Arena

Medalists

Medal table

Medalists

References

External links
BWF Results

 
BWF World Championships
World Championships
Badminton
1990s in Copenhagen
International sports competitions in Copenhagen
Badminton tournaments in Denmark
May 1991 sports events in Europe